Wilhelm Dittmann (1 November 1874 – 7 August 1954), was a German Social Democratic politician. From 1917 to 1922, he was secretary to the Central Committee of the Independent Social Democratic Party of Germany (USPD).

Wilhelm was the son of Josef and Auguste Dittmann. His father was a master wheelwright in Eutin.

References

1874 births
1954 deaths
People from Eutin
People from the Grand Duchy of Oldenburg
Social Democratic Party of Germany politicians
Independent Social Democratic Party politicians
Members of the Council of the People's Deputies
Members of the 13th Reichstag of the German Empire
Members of the Reichstag of the Weimar Republic